Richa Soni  is an Indian television actress. She made her debut in Shararat. She is known for her role of Bindiya in the ColorTV's daily soap Bhagyavidhaata . She has also appeared in shows like, Nachle Ve With Saroj Khan - Season 2, Badalte Rishton Ki Dastaan, Jaat Ki Jugni and Siya Ke Ram. She has also done short films like The Silent Statue (showcased in Cannes Film Festival and she also won the Award for "Best Actress in the Short Films Category" in the 2nd Jharkhand International Film Festival 2019. The web series Seasoned with Love premiered on Hungama Play on 16 April 2019.

Personal life
Soni is a Bengali, born and brought up in Muzaffarpur city in Bihar, from where she did her schooling and college education. She then moved to Mumbai.

Soni married businessman Jigar Ali Sumbhaniya in February 2019 following Bengali Hindu and Muslim rituals in two separate ceremonies.

Filmography

Television
Shararat
Bhagyavidhaata as Bindya
  Raavan as Dhanyamalini 
C.I.D.
Kashmakash Zindagi Ki
Pehchaan
Jamuniya (DD-1)
Badalte Rishton Ki Dastaan as Shama
Siya Ke Ram as Gargi
Jaat Ki Jugni as Savita 
Muskaan as Rakhi
AdhaFull as Roshini Mam
Sasural Genda Phool 2 as Rajni Indrabhan Kashyap

Films
Achal Rahe Suhag

References

External links 
 
 

Living people
Indian television actresses
Actresses from Bihar
Bengali people
People from Muzaffarpur
Actresses in Hindi television
21st-century Indian actresses
Year of birth missing (living people)